The 2021–22 Perth Scorchers Women's season was the seventh in the team's history. Coached by Shelley Nitschke and captained by Sophie Devine, the Scorchers finished the regular season of WBBL07 on top of the ladder to claim their first minor premiership. They hosted the championship decider at Perth Stadium on 27 November 2021, defeating the Adelaide Strikers by 12 runs to win a maiden WBBL title. Marizanne Kapp was named Player of the Final for her influential all-round performance, scoring 31* off 23 deliveries and producing bowling figures of 1/25 from four overs. For the second consecutive season, batter Beth Mooney was the league's leading run-scorer.

Squad 
Each 2021–22 squad was made up of 15 active players. Teams could sign up to five 'marquee players', with a maximum of three of those from overseas. Marquees were defined as any overseas player, or a local player who holds a Cricket Australia national contract at the start of the WBBL|07 signing period.

Personnel changes made ahead of the season included:

 English marquees Amy Jones and Sarah Glenn did not re-sign with the Scorchers in anticipation of a clashing schedule with national team duties.
 South African marquee Marizanne Kapp signed with the Scorchers, departing the Sydney Sixers.
 Sri Lankan marquee Chamari Athapaththu signed with the Scorchers, having previously played for the Melbourne Renegades.
 Nicole Bolton departed the Scorchers, signing with the Sydney Sixers.
 Alana King signed with the Scorchers, departing the Melbourne Stars.
 Jemma Barsby departed the Scorchers, signing with the Adelaide Strikers.
 Emma King departed the Scorchers, retiring from cricket after WBBL|06.
 Lisa Griffith signed with the Scorchers, departing the Sydney Sixers and having previously played for the Sydney Thunder.
 Lilly Mills signed with the Scorchers, departing the Brisbane Heat.
 Ashley Day signed with the Scorchers, having previously played for the Hobart Hurricanes.

The table below lists the Scorchers players and their key stats (including runs scored, batting strike rate, wickets taken, economy rate, catches and stumpings) for the season.

Ladder

Fixtures 
All times are local

Regular season

Final

Statistics and awards 
 Most runs: Beth Mooney – 547 (1st in the league)
Highest score in an innings: Beth Mooney – 101* vs Melbourne Renegades, 3 November 2021 
Most wickets: Heather Graham – 18 (4th in the league) 
Best bowling figures in an innings: Marizanne Kapp – 4/10 (4 overs) vs Hobart Hurricanes, 7 November 2021 
Most catches (fielder): Alana King – 8 (equal 5th in the league) 
Player of the Match awards:
Beth Mooney – 3 
Sophie Devine, Marizanne Kapp, Alana King – 2 each 
Heather Graham – 1 
WBBL|07 Player of the Tournament: Sophie Devine (equal 2nd), Beth Mooney (equal 2nd) 
WBBL|07 Team of the Tournament: Sophie Devine (captain), Beth Mooney 
Scorchers Player of the Year: Sophie Devine

References 

2021–22 Women's Big Bash League season by team
Perth Scorchers (WBBL)